Power of Soul: A Tribute to Jimi Hendrix is a 2004 tribute album to Jimi Hendrix. The album reached No. 50 on the Billboard Independent Albums chart.

Track listing

References

Jimi Hendrix tribute albums
2004 compilation albums